A Theory Of Race is a 2009 book by Joshua Glasgow. It argues that there is no such thing as race and so that all claims with a racial basis are false.

References 

2009 non-fiction books
Books about race and ethnicity